"Revulsion" is the 73rd episode of Star Trek: Voyager, the fifth episode of the fourth season. This is focused on an EMH (Emergency Medical Hologram; The Doctor)-like hologram on another ship, which is dealt with mostly by the Doctor and B'Elanna. In addition, sub-plots run their course on Voyager with other characters. Guest star Leland Orser plays the EMH-like hologram Dejaren on a spaceship that is encountered by Voyager. Leland Orser had also played a character on Deep Space Nine.

The episode, in retrospect, was noted for a possible allusion to male sexual abuse via the hologram. In contrast to historical examples in Trek history, like Bajoran comfort women, the character of Dejaren has been compared to Gigolo Joe from Spielberg's 2001 film A.I. However, this may be too broad an interpretation of the episode noting a more basic horror film element.

The episode is noted as paying homage to the tradition of "trashy science fiction horror" vibe in the Star Trek universe as portrayed by episodes like "Phage", "Cathexis", "Faces", "Projections", "Persistence of Vision", "Cold Fire", "Prototype", "Meld", "The Thaw", "Macrocosm", "Alter Ego", "Coda", "Darkling", "Phantasms", "Dark Page", "Sub Rosa", "Masks", "Eye of the Beholder" or "Genesis". Star Trek has a history of dabbling in horror such as the technological failure of the transporter in Star Trek: The Motion Picture when its malfunction kills two members of the crew.

Plot
The crew is sitting in the mess hall for a celebration in honor of Tuvok, who is promoted to lieutenant commander. After the party Tom Paris catches up with B'Elanna Torres. The two haven't talked since the incident with the warp core three days before, and Tom decides to make a move. B'Elanna confirms that she meant what she said when she confessed her love for him, and Tom accepts this with a kiss.

Shortly after the party ends Voyager receives a distress call, sent by Dejaren — a hologram alone aboard a ship. His six flesh-and-blood crewmates have been killed and he requests assistance. The Doctor is eager to meet a fellow hologram and he and B'Elanna take off in a shuttle to meet the disabled ship. When they beam on board, all is quiet. Dejaren stalks them for a few moments while they try to establish what is wrong with the ship. When he comes face-to-face with the away team, he is nervous, suspicious, and distraught. Dejaren introduces himself as an "isomorph." He says his crew suddenly died of a virus and he doesn't know what to do next. B'Elanna gets to work trying to stabilize his matrix so he can stay visible.

Meanwhile back on Voyager Harry Kim has been assigned to work with Seven of Nine. She correctly notes that he seems "apprehensive" at the prospect. Despite his wariness of her frightening Borg behavior, he seems to be developing a bit of a crush on her, and he finds working closely with her unsettling. They manage to get their work done, but they are interrupted when Seven cuts her hand on a piece of equipment. Tom Paris, who has recently been recruited as the Doctor's new assistant, mends the cut in sickbay. He notices that Harry is growing fond of her, and advises him to keep his distance.

B'Elanna has some trouble with Dejaren, who is emotionally labile and unpredictable. One minute he giggles at her need to sustain herself by consuming food ("you nibble like a fish!"), and the next he unleashes an angry tirade about the disgust he feels toward "organics." B'Elanna excuses herself and catches up with the Doctor, insisting that they leave the ship and the disturbing hologram behind. The Doctor brushes her off, suggesting she be more patient with Dejaren, who is simply lonely and lacking in appropriate communication skills. B'Elanna doesn't buy it, and heads off to locate the hologram's main control center.

As B'Elanna explores other decks of the ship, Dejaren accosts the Doctor and pours out his feelings. He has felt like a slave to the organics, who are weak and unsanitary and require ridiculous amounts of maintenance and hygiene just to stay functional. He has grown to hate them and is glad he has the ship to himself. He begs the Doctor to come with him and teach him how to use the ship and be free of organics forever. The Doctor starts to realize why B'Elanna is uncomfortable around this angst-ridden isomorph.

B'Elanna finds the matrix controls. She also finds the bodies of the crew, who were not killed by a virus. They were violently murdered — by Dejaren himself. Before she can shut down the homicidal hologram he appears behind her and grabs her. He thrusts his hand into her body and grips her heart.

Back on Voyager Harry is trying to get closer to Seven. He asks her out to the holodeck. She has textbook knowledge of human behavior and immediately understands that he is attempting to spark romantic interaction between them. Seven, who believes romance is irrelevant, suggests they proceed directly to copulation, and directs him to remove his clothes. Thoroughly unnerved, the embarrassed Harry retreats.

While B'Elanna's Klingon physiological backups are keeping her alive despite Dejaren having perforated one of the ventricles of her heart, she is still in need of Voyager'''s sickbay. She and the Doctor try to disable the crazed isomorph. He makes a grab for the Doctor's mobile emitter, but B'Elanna manages to jolt him with a high-voltage cable, which destabilizes his matrix for good. They hurry off the ship. Safely back in Voyagers sickbay, the Doctor patches up B'Elanna.

 Cast commentary 
Actress Jeri Ryan who plays Seven of Nine, said that "Revulsion" was one of her favorite episodes  along with "The Raven", "Hunters", "Prey", and the two-part "The Killing Game".

 Releases 
This episode was released on VHS, paired "The Raven".

In 2017, the complete Star Trek: Voyager'' television series was released in a DVD box set with special features.

References

External links
 

Star Trek: Voyager (season 4) episodes
1997 American television episodes
Holography in television